Launceston, Tasmania has a cool, temperate climate,
with four distinct seasons. The city is located in the Tamar Valley in Northern Tasmania and is surrounded by many large hills and mountains. With this type of topography, Launceston's weather patterns can change considerably in a short period.

Background
Having 2,500 hours of annual sunshine, Launceston is sunnier than Melbourne, a northward city in mainland Australia, which only receives around 2,300 hours of annual sunshine.

Winters are cool with minimum temperatures dropping below  an average of 61 days a year. The coldest month is July, with an average temperature range of  - .
Unlike many other areas of Tasmania and as well as a number of cities in the northern hemisphere that lie on the same latitude (such as Chicago, Cleveland, Tashkent, Tbilisi and Shenyang), Launceston rarely receives snowfall and is relatively mild.

Winter, for Launceston, is also the season with the least amount of wind. Because of this and the topographical effect of the Tamar Valley, Launceston winters are renowned for foggy mornings, with Launceston Airport the most fog-bound commercial airport in Australia. As in most of Tasmania, 2006 was the driest year when just  fell.

Precipitation

Cold fronts in winter account for much of this precipitation, with mountains surrounding Launceston regularly receiving snow in autumn, winter and spring. Launceston annual rainfall is somewhat lower than that of surrounding areas, particularly further north in the Tamar valley. This is due to the rain shadow effect of the Western Tiers located West of the city.

Seasonal conditions 
Launceston has a cool, temperate climate,
with four distinct seasons. Surrounded by many large hills and mountains, Launceston's weather patterns can change considerably in a short period.
Winters are cool with minimum temperatures dropping below  an average of 61 days a year.

The Bureau of Meteorology reported that 2007 was the hottest year ever recorded in Launceston since temperatures were first recorded in 1884.
During 2006 and 2007, Launceston had the hottest maximums throughout the state.

Summer 
Temperatures above  are extremely rare compared even to cities like Melbourne, occurring on fewer than five days per year as against thirty in Melbourne and over fifty in Adelaide. Launceston generally does not receive as many large thunderstorms as cities in mainland Australia, although during summer, thunderstorms are more frequent than in any other season. The Launceston suburb of Summerhill was hit by a tornado that descended from a thunderstorm on Christmas Eve 2001. Estimates suggest the tornado had wind speeds of between 200 and 250 km/h.

Autumn 
Autumn is a season of transition, and generally has the most settled weather patterns, although Launceston's worst floods both occurred in Autumn.

Winter 
Winter is typically the season with the least amount of wind, although the increased occurrence of cold frontal systems during the cooler months have helped cause wind gusts of up to 113 km/h - in the winters of 1949 and 1984 at Launceston Airport, 14.8 km away from Ti Tree Bend. This passage of cold frontal systems are responsible for winter being Launceston's and the rest of northern and western Tasmania's wettest season.

Spring 
Spring is mostly a transition from winter to summer. Cold weather reaches Tasmania less often and temperatures slowly begin to rise. Snowfalls, although rare, have been recorded in Launceston's surrounding areas as late as October, during 1940, 1978, 2003 and 2020. The month of October experiences the greatest rise in temperatures.

2009 Southeastern Australia heat wave 

The 2009 southeastern Australia heat wave was a heat wave that commenced in late January and led to record-breaking prolonged high temperatures in the region. During the heat wave, 50 separate locations across Australia set various records for consecutive, highest daytime and overnight temperatures.

The exceptional heat wave was caused by a slow moving high-pressure system that settled over the Tasman Sea, with a combination of an intense tropical low located off the North West Australian coast and a monsoon trough over Northern Australia, which produced ideal conditions for hot tropical air to be directed down over Southeastern Australia. The heat began in South Australia on 25 January but became more widespread over southeast Australia by 27 January. Higher temperatures returned on the following weekend with Melbourne recording its hottest day since records began in 1855: , also the hottest temperature ever recorded in an Australian capital city.

The heat wave generated extreme fire conditions during the peak of the 2008–09 Australian bushfire season, causing many bushfires in the affected region, contributing to the extreme bushfire conditions on 7 February, also known as the February 2009 Victorian bushfires, which claimed 173 lives in Victoria.

Launceston in January 2009
28th – 
29th – 
30th –  - Hottest day recorded in Launceston since records began in 1880.
31st –

See also
Environment of Australia

References

Launceston
Launceston, Tasmania